Priddy is an unincorporated community in Mills County in Northwestern Central Texas. The community was established in the late 19th century, and was named after Thomas Jefferson Priddy.

The Priddy Independent School District serves area students.

Climate
The climate in this area is characterized by relatively high temperatures and evenly distributed precipitation throughout the year.  The Köppen Climate System describes the weather as humid subtropical, and uses the abbreviation Cfa.

References

External links
 

Unincorporated communities in Texas
Unincorporated communities in Mills County, Texas